Venus Williams was the defending champion, but did not compete this year.

Shahar Pe'er won the title by defeating Anastasia Myskina 1–6, 6–3, 7–6(7–3) in the final.

Seeds
The top two seeds received a bye into the second round.

Draw

Finals

Top half

Bottom half

References
 Main and Qualifying Draws (WTA)

Istanbul Cup - Singles
İstanbul Cup